The Midland Railway's Paget locomotive, No. 2299, was an experimental steam locomotive constructed at its Derby Works in 1908 to the design of the General Superintendent Cecil Paget (though Richard Deeley was Locomotive Superintendent at the time). As the Midland shrouded the locomotive in secrecy, there is only one known photograph, which was not released until after The Grouping of 1923.

Overview
The locomotive had a total of eight uniflow cylinders arranged in two groups of four placed between the 1st and 2nd and 2nd and 3rd driving axles, with rotary steam distribution valves placed over each; a bronze sleeve in the valve body was rotated to control cutoff. Two were connected to the forward pair of the six driving wheels. Four were connected, two each side to the centre pair, with the final two behind the last pair. These drove a jackshaft which operated and reversed the valves, and cut off was controlled by rotary sleeves. The boiler was large and had an unusual integral firebox, lined with firebricks. Two-wheel pony trucks were fitted front and rear. It was the first 2-6-2 tender locomotive in Great Britain and would be the only one until the LNER Class V2 of 1936.

Finance
Paget had initially financed it himself, but unfortunately ran out of money, and the railway made up for the difference. There has been a history on the railways of a distrust of new ideas and Paget and Deeley were not on the best of terms. Lowe suggests that there was great hostility to it.

Problems
It had problems with seizing of the phosphor bronze sleeves in the cast iron steam chest, with leakage in the glands and piston rings. In 1912, one of the rotary valves seized while on a test run, the engine blocking the main line for seven hours. As a result, it was put in store at Derby and was broken up in 1918, while Paget was in France commanding the Royal Engineers Railway Operating Division.

References

Further reading
 
 Clayton, James, (1945) 'The Paget locomotive' in The railway gazette, 2 November 1945 (also reprinted in booklet form)
 Mills, Bob, (2000) 'The Paget locomotive' in BackTrack, vol. 14, no. 1 (January 2000), pp. 21–23

2299 Paget locomotive
2-6-2 locomotives
Experimental locomotives
Railway locomotives introduced in 1908
Individual locomotives of Great Britain
Standard gauge steam locomotives of Great Britain